John Ventimiglia is an American actor. He portrayed Artie Bucco in the HBO television series The Sopranos and had a recurring role as Dino Arbogast, an Organized Crime Control Bureau Chief for the NYPD, on the American police procedural/drama series Blue Bloods on CBS.

Early life 
Ventimiglia was born in Ridgewood, Queens to Sicilian immigrants and grew up in Teaneck, New Jersey. He graduated from Teaneck High School in 1981 where he played on the football team.

Career 
Ventimiglia has had parts in feature films such as Cop Land, Jesus' Son, The Iceman, The Funeral, The Wannabe, and Mickey Blue Eyes and has appeared in numerous television shows including Law & Order and NYPD Blue. He also made a brief cameo in the made-for-television movie Gotti.

In August 2007, Ventimiglia and the David Amram quartet presented a musical and oral homage to sociologist C. Wright Mills and beat author Jack Kerouac. They continued with a Kerouac show in Denmark in autumn of 2007. Ventimiglia starred in the comedy Rosencrantz and Guildenstern are Undead (2008), playing the role of Theo Horace. In 2008, he played a small role as a police officer in Notorious. In 2011, he appeared as "Weinstein" in the film Flypaper.

In 2011, he starred in a small indie film, PONIES. In 2012, he guest starred in the CBS short lived series Made in Jersey. In 2012, he starred, as Humberto Delgado, the Portuguese film Operation Autumn, a film about General Humberto Delgado's brutal assassination in Spain by the Portuguese fascists.

In 2016, he played Harry Magarac on the episode of Elementary, entitled "Murder Ex Machina", first aired on January 21, 2016. He also did narration for the Nat Geo television documentary series Inside the American Mob.

Filmography

Film

Television

References

External links 
 
 John Ventimiglia on HBO.com

Living people
American male film actors
American male television actors
American people of Italian descent
People of Sicilian descent
Male actors from New York City
Male actors from New Jersey
Teaneck High School alumni
People from Ridgewood, Queens
People from Park Slope
Year of birth missing (living people)
20th-century American male actors
21st-century American male actors